La Parisienne (original French title: Une parisienne) is a 1957 Technicolor French comedy film starring Brigitte Bardot, Charles Boyer and Henri Vidal, directed by Michel Boisrond. Bardot plays the daughter of the French President who marries her father's secretary, but the couple become jealous of each other's purported sexual flings. Costumes are by Pierre Balmain. Dialogue is in French, with dubbed versions in other languages.

Plot

Brigitte Laurier (Brigitte Bardot), daughter of the President of France, is madly in love with Michel Legrand (Henri Vidal), the chief of staff of her father. He tries to evade her, but she follows him to the airport as he meets his mistress, Mrs. Wilson (Madeleine Lebeau), who intends to divorce her husband to marry Michel.  He continues to shut down Brigitte's repeated sexual advances, but he finds that hard to do, as she has just appointed herself to an internship as Michel's secretary.

She creates a ruse whereby Michel is tricked into delivering urgent papers to the President (André Luguet), who is spending the weekend hunting in the countryside.  Michel's former mistress, Caroline d'Herblay, and her politician husband are also at the same hunting event, and Mrs. d'Herblay insists that Michel stay the weekend.  The President asks his daughter why she tricked Michel like this, and she proclaims her unrequited love for Michel as her father balks at her silliness.

Michel and Mrs. d'Herblay reunite secretly in the woods and they arrange a rendezvous later in the night once her husband is asleep.  As she slips out of her room later that night, her husband fakes snoring and follows her, suspecting she is up to no good.  At the same time, Brigitte heads to Michel's room and surprises him—as he was expecting Mme d'Herblay—and she tells him she wants to be his mistress and promises never to speak of marriage.  They kiss, but Mrs. d'Herblay walks in on them and a scene erupts.  Mr. d'Herblay (Noël Roquevert) himself hears vaguely sexual sounds emanating from the President's room (as he is lighting his smoking pipe), and a separate scene erupts whereby Mr. d'Herbaly wakes up everyone in the house—i.e., the Cabinet of France—as they investigate who is in Michel's locked room.  Mrs. d'Herblay is hidden and Brigitte is revealed to be in Michel's bed in front of the entire French government, thus embarrassing the President.  Not wanting to cause a scandal, Michel and Brigitte are forced to be married by her father. During their honeymoon, Michel tells Brigitte he is glad he married her, but she is unsure.  When they return to France, she tells her father she is sure Michel will cheat on her sooner or later, but her father is sure he will not.

The next day, Prince Charles (Charles Boyer) starts his state visit to France.  As she is preparing to go to the gala ball, Mrs. Wilson calls Michel—apparently not realising he is married now—and Brigitte picks up.  She is sure Michel is cheating on her with Mrs. Wilson, and she confronts him at the ball.  Michel laughs it off, but in a fit of jealously, she tells Michel she will cheat on him with the next person to walk through the door.  Michel laughs and bids her good luck as Prince Charles is that person.  Not backing down, she curtsies to make herself known to him, and slips into a side room.  Prince Charles follows her, and they both get on their knees to look for Brigitte's broken pearl bracelet.  She admits to him that she is in love with him, and Michel becomes jealous that the two of them are flirting.  He slaps her in public, and brings her home.

Mrs. Wilson calls the next morning, and when Brigitte answers, she sets up lunch for her and Michel for that afternoon.  Mrs. Wilson shows up and is still infatuated with him and kisses him as Brigitte watches.  Brigitte plays the role of maid, but is surly as she serves Mrs. Wilson.  Michel's office calls, but Brigitte pretends to be having a phone conversation with the Prince and says that she is going to the embassy to meet him.  Meanwhile, Mrs. Wilson storms off as she finds out the Brigitte is actually Michel's new wife.  As the women leave, Michel's office calls back and he realises it was just a ruse that the Prince called, and he knows Brigitte is lying.

However, Brigitte actually does go to the embassy and meets Prince Charles, who decides to cancel his plan to open a nursery with the Queen and instead spend the afternoon with Brigitte.  He offers to fly her in a new French fighter jet to have tea with the Queen of the United Kingdom, and they go to the airport.  While at the airport, Brigitte calls Michel to brag that she is flying with the Prince, but he doesn't believe her.  As they fly off, the Prince asks what Brigitte's name is, the Prince decides not to go to London, but instead fly to Nice and go for a swim.  After swimming, the Prince and Brigitte go to a beach restaurant, where the Prince is mistaken for a rowdy local.  The other locals stop them from leaving and a fight occurs until they realise he is actually the Prince.

Meanwhile, while the Queen is speaking at the nursery opening, the President and Michel realise the Prince actually did leave with Brigitte and is not sick with a migraine as is told to the press.  Michel becomes enraged with jealously that the Prince is with his wife, but the President begs him not to make a big issue out of this.  Michel goes to see the Prince to prove he is not sick, but the Queen stalls him until the Prince is able to return and act sick.  Michel apologises for his apparent mistake.

When Brigitte tells Michel she went to Nice with the Prince for a swim, having just left the embassy, he does not believe her and thinks she is making a fool of him.  They promise to always tell each other the truth, but when she again tells him she was with the Prince—the truth—he doesn't believe her. Ultimately, she tells him she was at the cinema with a friend and crosses her fingers.

Cast
 Brigitte Bardot as Brigitte Laurier
 Henri Vidal as Michel Legrand
 André Luguet as President Alcide Laurier
 Charles Boyer as Prince Charles
 Claire Maurier as Caroline Herblay
 Noël Roquevert as Mr. d'Herblay
 Madeleine Lebeau as Monique Wilson
 Nadia Gray as Queen Greta
 Fernand Sardou as Fernand the Barman
 Robert Pizani as Ambassador Mouchkine
 Judith Magre as Irma
 Harry-Max as L'ambassadeur
 Vera Talchi as Titine
 Marcel Pérès as The General (as Marcel Pérés)

References

External links
 
 
 

1957 films
French comedy films
1957 comedy films
Films directed by Michel Boisrond
Adultery in films
Films about presidents
Films produced by Angelo Rizzoli
1950s French films